Big Pharma may also refer to the pharmaceutical lobby.

Big Pharma: How the World's Biggest Drug Companies Control Illness is a 2006 book by British journalist Jacky Law. The book examines how major pharmaceutical companies determine which health care problems are publicised and researched.

Outlining the history of the pharmaceutical industry, Law identifies what she says is the failure of a regulatory framework that assumes pharmaceutical companies always produce worthwhile products that society will want.

Law has written about healthcare for 25 years, seven of them as associate editor of Scrip Magazine, a monthly magazine for the drugs industry.

Reception 
Ike Iheanacho writes about the book that "The author is clearly no great fan of the industry. But, refreshingly, she avoids the sort of lazy polemic that casts major pharmaceutical companies as an evil empire that continually foists its products on unwilling and unsuspecting healthcare professionals and patients."

See also
Bad Pharma (2012) by Ben Goldacre
 Side Effects (2008) by Alison Bass
 Lists about the pharmaceutical industry

References

External links
 Excerpt from the book

2006 non-fiction books
British non-fiction books
Medical books
Pharmaceutical industry